Roo'ra (Hangul: 룰라) was a co-ed hip hop and dance-pop vocal group from South Korea who was one of the country's most popular musical acts of the 1990s. The group debuted in 1994 with the hit album Roots of Reggae. Their second album, The Angel Who Lost Wings (1995), sold 1 million copies in record time. Roo'ra disbanded in 2001, then reunited in 2009 to release their ninth and final album, A9ain.

History 
The group caused significant controversy in 1996 through the discovery of their unattributed sampling of a Japanese track called "Omatsuri Ninja" (Japanese: お祭り忍者) by boy group Ninja directly in their own song "Cheon sang yu ae" (Hanja: 天上有愛; Hangul: 천상유애).

This incident raised a heated debate "[...] about the nature of "Korean-ness in popular music" and pushed this pointy but long dormant issue to the forefront in the mid-1990s. The group nearly split in 1996 due to the controversy, but eventually only came to an end in 2001 after the release of a final album.

In 2008, the group was reunited with Lee Sang-min, Go Young-wook, Kim Ji-hyun, and Chae Ri-na to work on an upcoming album. In the middle of the project, Shin Jung-hwan and Go Young-wook formed a temporary duo group, "Roo'ra Man", and released a single, "The Reason Why I Hate Winter" in December 2008. The single was produced by Lee Sang-min. Roo'ra's last album, Again, was released in July 2009 with "Going Going" as the first single.

Members 

The original members of the group were Lee Sang-min, Go Young-wook, Kim Ji-hyun, and Shin Jung-hwan. In 1995, Shin Jung-hwan left the group to fulfill his military service requirement, and was replaced by Chae Ri-na. In 1997, Kim Ji-hyun left the group to pursue a solo career, and was replaced by temporary vocalist Mikey Romeo. Kim Ji-hyun returned for the release of the group's next album in 1999. After Roo'ra disbanded in 2001, members Lee Sang-min, Chae Ri-na, Go Young-wook, and Kim Ji-hyun reunited in 2009.

Discography

Studio albums

Awards and nominations

References 

South Korean co-ed groups
South Korean dance music groups
South Korean pop music groups
K-pop music groups
1994 establishments in South Korea
Grand Prize Seoul Music Award recipients